The Quintuple Coalition refers to the electoral alliance of five revolutionary groups contesting in the 1979 Iranian Constitutional Convention election. The groups in coalition had Islamic and radical orientations. After the elections, the coalition sent an open letter to Ruhollah Khomeini and complained about "fraud".

Parties in coalition 

The five groups were:
 Revolutionary Movement of Muslim People of Iran (JAMA), led by Kazem Sami
 People's Mujahedin Organization (MEK), led by Massoud Rajavi
 Movement of Militant Muslims (MMM), led by Habibollah Peyman
 The Movement for Liberty, led by Asghar Sayyed Javadi – it was a newly-established and relatively small group that belonged to the center
 Islamic Organization of Council (SASH), led by Habibollah Ashouri – The group was only briefly active in 1979

Candidates 
On 18 July 1979, the coalition presented its candidates for all 10 seats in Tehran in an announcement published by Ayandegan.

See also 

 Coalition of Islamic Parties
 Septuple Coalition
 Grand National Alliance

References

1979 establishments in Iran
Aftermath of the Iranian Revolution
Defunct left-wing political party alliances
Defunct political party alliances in Iran
Islamic socialism
Organizations established in 1979
Organizations with year of disestablishment missing
People's Mojahedin Organization of Iran